Tulip is an information visualization framework dedicated to the analysis and visualization of relational data.  Tulip aims to provide the developer with a complete library, supporting the design of interactive information visualization applications for relational data that can be tailored to the problems being addressed.

Written in C++ the framework enables the development of algorithms, visual encodings, interaction techniques, data models, and domain-specific visualizations. Tulip allows the reuse of components; this makes the framework efficient for research prototyping as well as the development of end-user applications.

See also
 
 Graphviz
 Cytoscape
 Gephi

External links
 

Free application software
Graph drawing software